James Eichberger (born 4 August 1990) is a Mexican middle-distance runner who specialized in the 800 metres.

He finished fourth at the 2010 NACAC Under-23 Championships, seventh at the 2010 Ibero-American Championships, fourth at the 2013 Central American and Caribbean Championships, seventh at the 2014 Central American and Caribbean Games and eighth at the 2014 Ibero-American Championships. He also competed at the 2010 Central American and Caribbean Games, the 2013 World Championships and the 2015 Pan American Games without reaching the final.

His personal best times were 1:45.88 minutes in the 800 metres, achieved in July 2013 in Ninove; and 3:46.69 minutes in the 1500 metres, achieved in March 2012 in Tucson. Indoors he ran the 800 metres in 1:48.43 minutes in January 2011 in Fayetteville. This is the Mexican indoor record.

References

External links
 Arizona Wildcats bio

1990 births
Living people
Mexican male middle-distance runners
World Athletics Championships athletes for Mexico
Competitors at the 2010 Central American and Caribbean Games
Competitors at the 2014 Central American and Caribbean Games
Central American and Caribbean Games competitors for Mexico
Athletes (track and field) at the 2015 Pan American Games
Pan American Games competitors for Mexico
Arizona Wildcats men's cross country runners
Mexican expatriate sportspeople in the United States